2016–17 Deodhar Trophy was the 44th season of the Deodhar Trophy, a List A competition. It was  played in a three team format between Tamil Nadu, who were the winners of 2016–17 Vijay Hazare Trophy, and two teams selected by the BCCI. Tamil Nadu won the trophy, after beating India B by 42 runs in the final.

Squads

Group stage

Points table

Matches

Final

References

External links
 Series home at ESPNCricinfo



2017 in Indian cricket
Domestic cricket competitions in 2016–17
Deodhar Trophy